Picht is a surname. Notable people with this surname include:

 Edith Picht-Axenfeld (1914–2001), German pianist and harpsichordist
 Robert Picht (1937–2008), German academic

See also
 Pich

German-language surnames